Secretary of the Government or Cabinet Secretary is a senior government official in the executive branch. Positions include:
Cabinet Office Permanent Secretary in the United Kingdom
Cabinet Secretary (India)
Cabinet Secretary (Pakistan)
Secretary of the Cabinet (New Zealand)
Secretary of the Government (Bangladesh)
Secretary of the Government (Israel)
White House Cabinet Secretary in the United States

See also 
 Cabinet secretary